During the 2008–09 English football season, Sheffield United F.C. competed in the Football League Championship.

Season summary
Despite the sale of the previous season's top scorer, James Beattie, to Premier League newcomers Stoke City during the season, Sheffield United improved on the previous season's unsatisfactory form and were unlucky to finish the season in third place, three points behind Birmingham City. With this third-place finish came qualification for the playoffs: after narrowly defeating Preston North End 2–1 over two legs in the semi-final, United reached the playoff final, against Burnley, at Wembley. United lost 1–0, to a 13th-minute strike from Wade Elliott, which saw United consigned to a third consecutive season in the Championship.

Kit
Sheffield United continued their kit manufacturing agreement with French company Le Coq Sportif, who produced a new kit for the season, designed by United season ticket holder Ben Frost. A black away kit with silver trim, chosen by the club's players, was also introduced. The previous season's black and fluorescent green away kit was retained as the third kit.

The club ended their kit sponsorship agreement with American bank Capital One at the end of the previous season. The new kit sponsor for the season was visit Malta.com.

Players

First-team squad
Squad at end of season

Out on loan

Left club during season

References

External links
 Sheffield United squad for 2008–09 season
 Kits for 2008–09 Championship clubs

Notes

Sheffield United
Sheffield United F.C. seasons